Peter Cownie (born April 19, 1980) is an American politician.

Cownie was born and raised in Des Moines, Iowa and resides in West Des Moines, Iowa.  He has a B.A. in American government from the University of Virginia and a Master's of Public Administration with an emphasis in public policy from Drake University. He is a Republican Party member who served on the Iowa House of Representatives from 2009 to 2019. Until 2013, Cownie held the District 60 seat. He was subsequently redistricted to District 42.

Cownie's mother Patricia was appointed to the Iowa Board of Regents in 2015 by Governor Terry Branstad. During her tenure, Patricia Cownie served as president pro term. Branstad's successor Kim Reynolds did not nominate Patricia Cownie to a second term.

Electoral history 
*incumbent

References

External links 

 Representative Peter Cownie official Iowa General Assembly site
 
 Financial information (state office) at the National Institute for Money in State Politics

1980 births
University of Virginia alumni
Drake University alumni
Republican Party members of the Iowa House of Representatives
Living people
Politicians from Des Moines, Iowa
People from West Des Moines, Iowa
21st-century American politicians